Rashtriya Dalit Adhikar Manch is an Indian Non-governmental organization founded by Former Journalist and Lawyer who later became Member of Gujarat Legislative Assembly from the Vadgam Assembly constituency, Jignesh Mevani in July 2016 for Dalits in Gujarat.

Jignesh Mevani, the founder of RDAM fought 2017 Gujarat Elections without any political outfit's symbol but with his name attached to RDAM only. Mevani won the election in 2017, Independently.

References 

Non-governmental organizations